Sub-caliber training is used to save wear and expense when training with a larger gun by use of smaller weapons (sometimes, but not always, with very similar ballistic characteristics). The smaller weapons could be inserted into the larger weapon's barrel, externally attached to the barrel or mounted above the weapon.

Examples include 2.25-Inch Sub-Caliber Aircraft Rocket to train aircraft pilots to shoot aerial rockets that emerged during WWII, or the M303 Sub-Caliber insert for the  M120 mortar that allows the mortar to use  ammunition or the M49A1 sub-caliber device, which used 7.62×51mm NATO rifle rounds in the  M67 recoilless rifle. These devices/weapons have been used for guns as large as the  main guns of battleships.

See also
 Caliber conversion sleeve
 Spotting rifle

References

Military education and training